VA-37 has the following meanings:
Attack Squadron 37 (U.S. Navy)
State Route 37 (Virginia)